The Vontrigger Hills are a low mountain range in the eastern Mojave Desert, in eastern San Bernardino County, California.

References 

Lanfair Valley
Mountain ranges of the Mojave Desert
Mojave National Preserve
Mountain ranges of San Bernardino County, California
Hills of California